is a Japanese football player for FC Gifu.

Club statistics
Updated to end of 2018 season.

References

External links
Profile at Avispa Fukuoka
Profile at Vissel Kobe

1990 births
Living people
Fukuoka University alumni
Association football people from Fukuoka Prefecture
Japanese footballers
J1 League players
J2 League players
J3 League players
Avispa Fukuoka players
Vissel Kobe players
FC Gifu players
Association football forwards